Cantoris (Latin: "of the cantor") is the side of a church choir occupied by the Cantor. In English churches this is typically the choir stalls on the north side of the chancel, although there are some notable exceptions, such as Durham Cathedral, Ely Cathedral, Carlisle Cathedral and Southwell Minster. The opposite side is known as decani, which is where the dean sat.

From the perspective of the congregation facing the altar, which by convention is regarded as liturgical East, this would be on the left (liturgical North) side.  

While the cantoris side of the choir corresponds to the Gospel side of the altar (so called from the custom of reading the Epistle from the south end of the altar, and the Gospel from the north end of the altar), cantoris and decani properly refer only to sides of the choir, not to the sides of the altar. The arrangement of the cantoris and decani sections is called the "split chancel" model, which favors antiphonal and responsorial performance.

References

Choirs
Church architecture